The Tapper class are a class of patrol boats in service with the Swedish Navy since the 1990s (the word tapper means "brave" in Swedish).

Design 

Tapper boats first function is to protect and patrol the Swedish coastal waters. Its armament includes 12.7 mm heavy machine guns, anti-submarine Rockets, naval mines and depth charges.

Because of their small size of 22 meters and a displacement of 62 tons. these patrol boats can operate in extremely shallow water.

These patrol boats have a crew of 8 sailors - consisting of 4 officers and 4 ratings. Further they can accommodate 10 passengers.

History 

From 1993-1999 a total of 12 ships were constructed and entered service with the Swedish navy and amphibious corps.

The class was about to retire in 2014 but after the Russian intervention in Ukraine and Russian military build-up in the Baltic sea it was decided that the boats will remain in service and be modified as well.

In 2020 the first six boats of the class had a comprehensive overhaul and upgrade program in which they were equipped - among other things - with the Kongsberg Maritime sonar for Anti-submarine warfare.

Ships in class

References

External links 
  Bevakningsbåt typ 80 (General information about the Tapper-class patrol boat) Försvarsmakten
 Swedish navy upgrades Tapper-class patrol boat with ASW capability GLOBAL DEFENSE CORP
 First of six Tapper-class Patrol Boats re-joins Swedish Navy Following ASW Upgrade NAVALNEWS

Patrol boat classes
Ships of the Swedish Navy